The 1948 edition of the Campeonato Carioca kicked off on July 11, 1948 and ended on December 12, 1948. It was organized by FMF (Federação Metropolitana de Futebol, or Metropolitan Football Federation). Eleven teams participated. Botafogo won the title for the 9th time. no teams were relegated.

System
The tournament would be disputed in a double round-robin format, with the team with the most points winning the title.

Torneio Municipal

Playoffs

Championship

References

Campeonato Carioca seasons
Carioca